is a Japanese pole vaulter. He competed in the pole vault event at the 2012 Summer Olympics failing to clear any height in the qualifying round. His biggest success to date is the sixth place at the 2013 World Championships.

He has personal bests of 5.75 metres outdoors (Hiratsuka 2013) and 5.77 metres indoors (Reno 2016).

International competitions

References

1992 births
Living people
People from Okazaki, Aichi
Sportspeople from Aichi Prefecture
Japanese male pole vaulters
Olympic male pole vaulters
Olympic athletes of Japan
Athletes (track and field) at the 2012 Summer Olympics
Athletes (track and field) at the 2016 Summer Olympics
Asian Games gold medalists for Japan
Asian Games gold medalists in athletics (track and field)
Athletes (track and field) at the 2014 Asian Games
Athletes (track and field) at the 2018 Asian Games
Medalists at the 2018 Asian Games
Universiade medalists in athletics (track and field)
Universiade silver medalists for Japan
Medalists at the 2013 Summer Universiade
World Athletics Championships athletes for Japan
Japan Championships in Athletics winners
Athletes (track and field) at the 2020 Summer Olympics